The Donnelly House (also known as the Mt. Dora Lodge No. 238 F&AM) is a historic home in Mount Dora, Florida. It is located on Donnelly Avenue. On April 4, 1975, it was added to the U.S. National Register of Historic Places.

John P. Donnelly, a native of Pittsburg, came to Mount Dora in 1879. In 1881, he married Annie McDonald Stone, a prominent landholder in the community. Successful in a number of real estate and business ventures, Donnelly built this imposing Queen Anne style house in 1893. He was among the founders of the local yacht club, and served as the city's first mayor in 1910. In 1924, he sold the land for the park named for his wife, who had died in 1908. He died in 1930. The Donnelly House, now owned by Mount Dora Lodge #238, F.&A.M., was listed in the National Register of Historic Places on April 4, 1975.

See also
List of George Franklin Barber works

References

External links
 Lake County listings at National Register of Historic Places
 Florida's Office of Cultural and Historical Programs
 Lake County listings
 Lake County markers
 Mount Dora Lodge # 238, F&AM

Houses on the National Register of Historic Places in Florida
National Register of Historic Places in Lake County, Florida
Masonic buildings in Florida
Houses in Lake County, Florida
Clubhouses on the National Register of Historic Places in Florida
Mount Dora, Florida
Houses completed in 1893
1893 establishments in Florida
Queen Anne architecture in Florida